Litoria bibonius is a species of frog of the subfamily Pelodryadinae.

Distribution 
This species is found in the D'Entrecasteaux, Normanby and Goodenough islands in Papua New Guinea.

Description 
It can be distinguished from other lowland New Guinea green tree frogs by the following features: only one third of its fingers are webbed, it has no vomerine teeth, it has a smooth tympanium instead of a granular one, and its snout is long and pointed. The hidden surfaces of its thighs are yellow and its dorsum is uniformly green.

Like other members of the Litoria genus, it has horizontal irises, but unlike all Litoria species from Papua New Guinea, it has red eyes.

Taxonomy 
Litoria bibonius is part of the species-group L. bicolor, which was created to accommodate 7 species from the region that had characteristics in common.

The other members of the group are: Litoria cooloolensis and Litoria fallax in Australia; Litoria bicolor in Austrália and Papua New Guine; Litoria contrastens, Litoria longicrus and Litoria mystax in Papua New Guine.

References 

 Kraus & Allison, 2004 : Two New Treefrogs from Normanby Island, Papua New Guinea. Journal of Herpetology, vol. 38, n. 2, pp. 197–207.

External links 
 
 

Litoria
Amphibians of Papua New Guinea
Amphibians described in 2004